The 1970 Balkans Cup was an edition of the Balkans Cup, a football competition for representative clubs from the Balkan states. It was contested by 6 teams and Partizani Tirana won the trophy.

Group A

Group B

Finals

First Leg

Second Leg

Partizani Tirana won 4–1 on aggregate.

Notes
Note 1: Beroe Stara Zagora didn't show up for the second leg.

References

External links 

 RSSSF Archive → Balkans Cup
 
 Mehmet Çelik. "Balkan Cup". Turkish Soccer

1970
1969–70 in European football
1970–71 in European football
1969–70 in Romanian football
1970–71 in Romanian football
1969–70 in Greek football
1970–71 in Greek football
1969–70 in Bulgarian football
1970–71 in Bulgarian football
1969–70 in Turkish football
1970–71 in Turkish football
1969–70 in Yugoslav football
1970–71 in Yugoslav football
1969–70 in Albanian football
1970–71 in Albanian football